Aberdeen Proving Ground (APG) (sometimes erroneously called Aberdeen Proving Grounds) is a U.S. Army facility located adjacent to Aberdeen, Harford County, Maryland, United States. More than 7,500 civilians and 5,000 military personnel work at APG. There are 11 major commands among the tenant units, including:
 United States Army Communications-Electronics Command (CECOM)
 United States Army Combat Capabilities Development Command (CCDC)
 United States Army Test and Evaluation Command (ATEC)
 Edgewood Arsenal
 Adelphi Laboratory Center
The Army Reserve Information Operations Command
Unified Cross Domain Services Management Office
HQ, U.S. Army Contracting Command (Army Contracting Command –APG, Adelphi Contracting Division)
U.S Army 93rd Signal Network - Network Enterprise Center
Logistics Readiness Center
U.S. Army Cyber Operation Group – 335th Signal Command
Blossom Point Research Facility

History
APG is the U.S. Army's oldest active proving ground, established on 20 October 1917, six months after the U.S. entered World War I. The planning and construction were overseen by Brigadier General Colden Ruggles, who later served as the Army's Chief of Ordnance. Its location allowed design and testing of ordnance materiel to take place near contemporary industrial and shipping centers.  The proving ground was created as a successor to the Sandy Hook Proving Ground, which was too small for some of the larger weapons being tested. At the peak of World War II, APG had billeting space for 2,348 officers and 24,189 enlisted personnel.

Prompt critical excursion
Aberdeen was home to the Army Pulse Radiation Facility Reactor, in 1968. On 6 September 1968, this reactor was the site of a prompt critical excursion during commissioning tests. This accident harmed no personnel but did release enough heat to reach the melting point of the fuel in the core, 1150°C. This caused damage to the fuel components of the reactor, fusing the four central rings together. This is one of thirty-three prompt critical accidents worldwide, between 1949 and 2000.

Base Realignment and Closure program
Under the Base Realignment and Closure (BRAC) program, as announced in 2005, the APG is projected to lose the Ordnance School and associated R&D facilities with 3862 military and 290 civilian jobs moving to Fort Lee, Virginia. APG will gain 451 military and 5,661 civilian jobs from Fort Monmouth, New Jersey. As a result, the net change is a loss of 3,411 military jobs and a gain of 5,371 civilian jobs.

Edgewood Arsenal
Although civilian contractors produced the major portion of conventional munitions for World War I, the United States government built federally owned plants on Aberdeen Proving Ground for the manufacture of toxic gas. These poison gas manufacturing facilities came to be known as Edgewood Arsenal. Edgewood Arsenal included plants to manufacture mustard gas, chloropicrin and phosgene, and separate facilities to fill artillery shells with these chemicals. Some of this gas was shipped overseas for use in French and British artillery shells.

The Edgewood area was used for the development and testing of chemical agent munitions. From 1917 to the present, the Edgewood area conducted chemical research programs, manufactured chemical agents, and tested, stored, and disposed of toxic materials.

From 1955 to 1975, the U.S. Army Chemical Corps conducted classified medical studies at Edgewood Arsenal, Maryland. The purpose was to evaluate the impact of low-dose chemical warfare agents on military personnel and to test protective clothing and pharmaceuticals.  About 7,000 soldiers took part in these experiments that involved exposures to more than 250 different chemicals, according to the Department of Defense (DoD). Some of the volunteers exhibited symptoms at the time of exposure to these agents but long-term follow-up was not planned as part of the DoD studies.

The agents tested included chemical warfare agents and other related agents:
 Anticholinesterase nerve agents (Agent VX, sarin, and common organophosphorus (OP) and carbamate pesticides)
 Mustard agent
 Nerve agent antidotes atropine and scopolamine
 Nerve agent reactivators (e.g., the common OP antidote 2-PAM chloride)
 Psychoactive agents (LSD, PCP, cannabinoids, and Agent BZ)
 Irritants and riot control agents
 Alcohol and caffeine

During the week of July 14, 1969, personnel from Naval Applied Science Laboratory in conjunction with personnel from Limited War Laboratory conducted a defoliation test along the shoreline of Poole's Island, Aberdeen Proving Ground using Agent Orange and Agent Orange Plus foam.

The Gunpowder Meetinghouse and Presbury Meetinghouse located within the grounds of Edgewood Arsenal are listed on the National Register of Historic Places.

Other component locations within Aberdeen Proving Ground

Other parts of APG not attached to the main installation include the Churchville Test Area in Harford County, and the Carroll Island and Graces Quarters in Baltimore County, Maryland. The Churchville Test Area is a test track with hills that provide steep natural grades and tight turns to stress engines, drivetrains, and suspensions for army vehicles, including M1 Abrams tanks, Bradley Fighting Vehicles, and Humvees.

The eastern half of Carroll Island was used as a testing location for open air static testing of chemical weapons since the 1950s. Simulant agents, incendiaries, decontaminating compounds, signaling and screening smokes, mustard, and herbicides were also released as well as riot control gasses. The test sites consisted of spray grids, a wind tunnel, test grids, and small buildings.

Edgewood Chemical Activity is a chemical-weapons depot located at APG. Elimination of the chemicals held here was put on an accelerated schedule after the September 11, 2001, attacks, and all chemical weapons were destroyed by February 2006.

Fort Hoyle was established on October 7, 1922, and was created from a portion of the Edgewood Arsenal.  Named for Brigadier General Eli D. Hoyle, who had commanded the 6th Field Artillery Regiment, the post was home to Headquarters, 1st Field Artillery Brigade (1922 to 1939), the 6th Field Artillery Regiment (1922 to 1940), the 1st Ammunition Train (1922 to 1930), and the 99th Field Artillery Regiment (minus 2nd Battalion) (1940 to 1941). Fort Hoyle was officially disestablished as a separate military post when it was reabsorbed by Edgewood Arsenal on September 10, 1940.

The U.S. Army Ordnance Corps Museum previously located at APG, was moved to Fort Lee, Virginia, as a result of the 2005 Base Realignment and Closure (BRAC) Act.

Geography
Its northernmost point is near the mouth of the Susquehanna River, where the river enters the Chesapeake Bay, while on the south, it is bordered by the Gunpowder River. The installation lies on two peninsulas separated by the Bush River. The northeastern is known as the Aberdeen Area and the southwestern is called the Edgewood Area (formerly the Edgewood Arsenal).

Demographics
For statistical purposes the base is delineated as a census-designated place (Aberdeen Proving Ground CDP) by the U.S. Census Bureau. As of the 2020 census, the resident population was 1,668.

Contamination
The Edgewood area of the Aberdeen Proving Ground site was proposed to the Environmental Protection Agency's National Priorities List of the most serious uncontrolled or abandoned hazardous waste sites requiring long term remedial action on April 10, 1985. The site was formally added to the National Priorities List on February 21, 1990.

The Edgewood area has large areas of land and water and numerous buildings that are contaminated or suspected of contamination. Virtually all the land areas of the site contain contaminated or potentially contaminated sites and potentially buried ordnance. Substances disposed of in the area include significant quantities of napalm, white phosphorus, and chemical agents. On-site surface waters include rivers, streams, and wetlands.

Edgewood area standby water supply wells in the Canal Creek area previously served approximately 3,000 people. The wells have been abandoned. The Long Bar Harbor well field of the County Department of Public Works and the well field used by the Joppatowne Sanitary Subdistrict serve 35,000 people within  of the site. On-site groundwater sampling has identified perchlorate, various metals, volatile organic compounds (VOCs) and chemical warfare agent degradation products. On-site soil contamination sampling has identified various VOCs, metals, and unexploded ordnance in surface and subsurface soil. On-site surface water sampling has identified various metals, pesticides, phosphorus, and VOCs. People who accidentally ingest or come in direct contact with contaminated groundwater, surface water, soil, or sediments may be at risk. The area is a designated habitat for bald eagles.

Controversies
A scandal at the APG surfaced in 1996.  The U.S. Army brought charges against twelve commissioned and non-commissioned male officers for sexual assault of female trainees under their command.

Following campaigning by PETA, the Physicians Committee for Responsible Medicine and other organizations, the U.S. military announced in 2011 that it was replacing its use of monkeys in the Army's nerve-agent attack training courses with human simulators and other non-animal teaching methods. The training drills had been carried out on vervet monkeys and conducted at Aberdeen Proving Ground.

See also
ENIAC
ORDVAC
BRLESC
Aberdeen scandal (1996)
United States Army Research Laboratory
Ballistic Research Laboratory
Naval Air Weapons Station China Lake
Dugway Proving Ground
United States Army Ordnance Training and Heritage Center
Herman Goldstine
Edgewood Arsenal human experiments
Poplar Island (Chesapeake Bay)
Maryland World War II Army Airfields
Nevada Test and Training Range
Semipalatinsk Test Site

References

Further reading
Oliveros, James P. and Don A. Vroblesky. (1989). Hydrogeology of the Canal Creek area, Aberdeen Proving Ground, Maryland [Water-Resources Investigations Report 89-4021 ].  Towson, Md.: U.S. Department of the Interior, U.S. Geological Survey.
 
United States. Congress. Senate. Committee on Armed Services. (1997). Army sexual harassment incidents at Aberdeen Proving Ground and sexual harassment policies within the Department of Defense: hearing before the Committee on Armed Services, United States Senate, One Hundred Fifth Congress, first session, February 4, 1997. Washington, D.C.  Government Printing Office.
 information about Decommissioning aberdeen (worldwidescience.org)

External links

Aberdeen Proving Ground, Global Security
Edgewood Chemical Activity, Global Security
U.S. Army Ordnance Foundation

Defense Commissary Agency

United States Army posts
Military installations in Maryland
Proving grounds
Military Superfund sites
Superfund sites in Maryland
Aberdeen, Maryland
Buildings and structures in Harford County, Maryland
Historic American Engineering Record in Maryland
1917 establishments in Maryland
Maryland populated places on the Chesapeake Bay
Military installations established in 1917